John Byers may refer to:

John Byer (1903–1988), Barbadian cricketer
John Byers (architect) (1872–1966), Southern Californian architect and builder noted for use of the Spanish Colonial Revival style
John Fitzgerald Byers, usually known just as "Byers", a fictional character in The X-Files television series and a member of the Lone Gunmen

See also
Jonathan Byers (disambiguation)